Treasure Box is a horror novel by Orson Scott Card.

Treasure Box may also refer to:

Treasure Box (T-ara album)
T-ara Japan Tour 2013: Treasure Box
Treasure Box – The Complete Sessions 1991–1999, a compilation boxset from the Cranberries
"Treasure Box", an episode of the television series Teletubbies

See also
 Five Treasure Box, an album by F.T. Island
 Buried treasure (disambiguation)
 Treasure chest (disambiguation)
 Strong box (disambiguation)